Lucille Has Messed My Mind Up is the debut album of American musician Jeff Simmons. Released in 1969, the album was produced by Frank Zappa, who wrote two songs for the album under the pseudonym "La Marr Bruister". The album features musicians Craig Tarwater and John Kehlior, both of whom had previously been members of the Seattle group The Daily Flash.

Lucille Has Messed My Mind Up was described as the second best album on the Straight Records label by Mojo Magazine. In 2007, it was re-issued on CD by World In Sound Records. The title track, on which Zappa plays the lead guitar, was later rerecorded as part of Zappa's 1979 album, Joe's Garage. Another track, "Wonderful Wino," was rerecorded and released on Zappa's 1976 album, Zoot Allures.

Tracks

Personnel
 Jeff Simmons - bass, vocals, piano, organ, accordion, guitar
 Ian Underwood - saxophone
 Craig Tarwater - guitar
 Frank Zappa - guitar (5, 6)
 Ron Woods - drums, tambourine, maracas
 John Kehlior - drums (5, 6)

References

1969 debut albums
Blues rock albums by American artists
Jeff Simmons (musician) albums
Albums produced by Frank Zappa
Straight Records albums